Somogy is an administrative county (comitatus or vármegye) in present Hungary, and also in the former Kingdom of Hungary.

Somogy County lies in south-western Hungary, on the border with Croatia (Koprivnica-Križevci County and Virovitica-Podravina County). It stretches between the river Dráva and the southern shore of Lake Balaton. It shares borders with the Hungarian counties of Zala, Veszprém, Fejér, Tolna, and Baranya. It is the most sparsely populated county in Hungary. The capital of Somogy County is Kaposvár. Its area is 6,036 km2.

History 

Somogy was also the name of a historic administrative county (comitatus) of the Kingdom of Hungary. Its territory, which was slightly larger than that of present Somogy County, is now in south-western Hungary. The capital of the county was and still is Kaposvár.

Demographics

In 2015, it had a population of 312,084 and the population density was 52/km2.

Ethnicity
Besides the Hungarian majority, the main minorities are the Roma (approx. 16,000), Germans (3,000) and Croats (1,500).

Total population (2011 census): 316,137
Ethnic groups (2011 census):
Identified themselves: 287,692 persons:
Hungarians: 265,464 (92,27%)
Gypsies: 16,167 (5,62%)
Germans: 3,039 (1,06%)
Others and indefinable: 3,022 (1,05%)
Approx. 46,000 persons in Somogy County did not declare their ethnic group at the 2011 census.

Religion

Religious adherence in the county according to 2011 census:

Catholic – 168,307 (Roman Catholic – 167,719; Greek Catholic – 546);
Reformed – 21,176; 
Evangelical – 5,807;
other religions – 3,829; 
Non-religious – 35,503; 
Atheism – 3,056;
Undeclared – 78,459.

Regional structure

Politics 

The Somogy County Council, elected at the 2019 local government elections, is made up of 15 counselors, with the following party composition:

Presidents of the General Assembly

Municipalities 
Somogy County has 1 urban county, 15 towns, 2 large villages and 227 villages.

City with county rights
(ordered by population, as of 2011 census)
 Kaposvár (66,245) – county seat

Towns

Siófok (25,045)
Marcali (11,736)
Barcs (11,420)
Nagyatád (11,032)
Balatonboglár (5,736)
Balatonlelle (5,217)
Csurgó (5,214)
Fonyód (4,793)
Tab (4,533)
Nagybajom (3,330)
Lengyeltóti (3,050)
Kadarkút (2,653)
Zamárdi (2,386)
Balatonföldvár (2,207)
Igal (1,270)

Villages

 Alsóbogát
 Andocs
 Ádánd
 Babócsa
 Bábonymegyer
 Bakháza
 Balatonberény
 Balatonendréd
 Balatonfenyves
 Balatonkeresztúr
 Balatonmáriafürdő
 Balatonőszöd
 Balatonszabadi
 Balatonszárszó 
 Balatonszemes
 Balatonszentgyörgy
 Balatonújlak
 Bárdudvarnok
 Baté
 Bálványos
 Bedegkér
 Bélavár
 Beleg
 Berzence 
 Bodrog
 Bolhás
 Bolhó
 Bonnya
 Böhönye
 Bőszénfa
 Buzsák
 Büssü
 Csákány
 Cserénfa
 Csokonyavisonta
 Csoma
 Csömend
 Csököly
 Csombárd
 Csurgónagymarton
 Darány
 Drávagárdony
 Drávatamási
 Ecseny
 Edde
 Felsőmocsolád
 Fiad
 Fonó
 Főnyed
 Gadács
 Gadány
 Gamás
 Gálosfa
 Gige
 Gölle
 Gyékényes
 Görgeteg
 Gyugy
 Hajmás
 Hács
 Háromfa
 Hedrehely
 Hencse
 Heresznye
 Hetes
 Hollád
 Homokszentgyörgy
 Hosszúvíz
 Iharos
 Iharosberény
 Inke
 Istvándi
 Jákó
 Juta
 Kapoly
 Kaposfő
 Kaposgyarmat
 Kaposhomok
 Kaposkeresztúr
 Kaposmérő
 Kaposszerdahely
 Kaposújlak
 Karád
 Kastélyosdombó
 Kaszó
 Kazsok
 Kálmáncsa
 Kánya
 Kára
 Kelevíz
 Kercseliget
 Kereki
 Kéthely
 Kisasszond
 Kisbajom
 Kisberény
 Kisbárapáti
 Kisgyalán
 Kiskorpád
 Komlósd
 Kötcse
 Kőröshegy
 Kőkút
 Kutas
 Lábod
 Lad
 Lakócsa
 Látrány
 Libickozma
 Lulla
 Magyaratád
 Magyaregres
 Mernye
 Mesztegnyő
 Mezőcsokonya
 Mike
 Miklósi
 Mosdós
 Nagyberki
 Nagyberény
 Nagycsepely
 Nagykorpád
 Nagyszakácsi
 Nágocs
 Nemesdéd
 Nemeskisfalud
 Nemesvid
 Nikla
 Nyim
 Orci
 Ordacsehi
 Osztopán
 Öreglak
 Ötvöskónyi
 Őrtilos
 Pamuk
 Patalom
 Patca
 Patosfa
 Pálmajor
 Péterhida
 Pogányszentpéter
 Polány
 Porrog
 Porrogszentkirály
 Porrogszentpál
 Potony
 Pusztakovácsi
 Pusztaszemes
 Ráksi
 Rinyabesenyő
 Rinyakovácsi
 Rinyaszentkirály
 Rinyaújlak
 Rinyaújnép
 Ságvár
 Sántos
 Sávoly
 Segesd
 Sérsekszőlős
 Siójut
 Som
 Somodor
 Somogyacsa
 Somogyaracs
 Somogyaszaló
 Somogybabod
 Somogybükkösd
 Somogycsicsó
 Somogydöröcske
 Somogyegres
 Somogyfajsz
 Somogygeszti
 Somogyjád
 Somogymeggyes
 Somogysimonyi
 Somogyszentpál
 Somogyszil
 Somogyszob
 Somogysámson
 Somogysárd
 Somogytúr
 Somogyudvarhely
 Somogyvámos
 Somogyvár
 Somogyzsitfa
 Szabadi
 Szabás
 Szántód
 Szegerdő
 Szenna
 Szenta
 Szentbalázs
 Szentborbás
 Szentgáloskér
 Szenyér
 Szilvásszentmárton
 Szorosad
 Szólád
 Szőkedencs
 Szőlősgyörök
 Szulok
 Tapsony
 Tarany
 Taszár
 Táska
 Tengőd
 Teleki
 Tikos
 Torvaj
 Tótújfalu
 Törökkoppány
 Újvárfalva
 Várda
 Varászló
 Vése
 Visnye
 Visz
 Vízvár
 Vörs
 Zala
 Zákány
 Zics
 Zimány
 Zselickisfalud
 Zselickislak
 Zselicszentpál

 municipalities are large villages.

See also
 List of tourist attractions in Somogy County
 Slovenes in Somogy

Gallery

International relations 
Somogy County has a partnership relationship with:

References

External links

 Official site in Hungarian
 Somogyi Hírlap (sonline.hu) - The county portal
Hungary at GeoHive

 
Counties of Hungary
History of Somogy